This article lists diplomatic missions resident in Latvia.  At present, the capital city of Riga hosts 38 embassies.  Several other countries have ambassadors accredited to Latvia, with most being resident in Stockholm, Moscow, Warsaw or other Nordic capitals.

In late-November 2006, Riga hosted the 19th NATO Summit, significantly boosting the diplomatic profile of the country.

Diplomatic missions in Riga

Consulates in Latvia

Non-resident embassies 
Stockholm:

 

 

Copenhagen:

 

Helsinki:

 

 

Warsaw:

 

Berlin:

 

 

 

Brussels:

The Hague:

Moscow:

  
Minsk:
 

Vilnius:

 

Other cities:
 (Andorra la Vella)
 (Paris)
 (Valletta)
 (Kyiv)
 (San Marino)
 (Oslo)

Closed missions

 Riga (Embassy) — closed in 2015

 Riga (Embassy) — closed in 2012

 Daugavpils (Consulate-General) — closed in 2022
 Liepāja (Consulate-General) — closed in 2022

See also
 Foreign relations of Latvia
 List of diplomatic missions of Latvia

Notes

References

 Riga Diplomatic List

list
Latvia
Diplomatic missions
Dip
Diplomatic missions